Charles Victor Beslay (1795, Dinan, Côtes-d'Armor – 1878, Neuchâtel) was the oldest member of the Paris Commune.

An engineer, he was councillor general of Morbihan in 1830. Later, in Paris, he founded a steam machine factory, and tried to apply the ideas of his friend Proudhon on the association of capital to work. After the 1848 Revolution  the provisional government named him Commissioner of the Republic in Morbihan. He was a moderate republican member of the Constituent Assembly where he suppressed the insurgents of the insurgency of June 1848. He did not sit in the legislative assembly. In the Second Empire, he was bankrupted creating a bank which exchanged and discounted using Proudhonian ideas. in 1866, he joined the International Workingmen's Association. 

During the siege of Paris by the Germans (September 1870 – March 1871), he was delegate to the Comité central républicain des Vingt arrondissements with title of the 6th arrondissement. On 26 March he was elected to the Conseil de la Commune of the 6th arrondissement. On 29 March he became a member of the Finance Commission and became delegate of the Commune for the Banque de France. At the end of May 1871, due to a free pass from the Thiers government, he became a refugee in Switzerland after the failure of the Commune. In December 1872, the war council made no case against him.

Sources
Bernard Noël, Dictionnaire de la Commune, Flammarion, collection Champs, 1978.

1795 births
1878 deaths
People from Dinan
Politicians from Brittany
Moderate Republicans (France)
Members of the 2nd Chamber of Deputies of the July Monarchy
Members of the 3rd Chamber of Deputies of the July Monarchy
Members of the 1848 Constituent Assembly
French refugees
Burials at Père Lachaise Cemetery
Prefects of Morbihan
Communards
Members of the International Workingmen's Association